3'-5' exoribonuclease CSL4 homolog is an enzyme that in humans is encoded by the EXOSC1 gene.

This gene encodes a core component of the exosome complex. The mammalian exosome is required for rapid degradation of AU rich element-containing RNAs but not for poly(A) shortening. The association of this protein with the exosome is mediated by protein-protein interactions with ribosomal RNA-processing protein 42 and ribosomal RNA-processing protein 46.

Interactions
Exosome component 1 has been shown to interact with:
 Exosome component 5, 
 Exosome component 6, and
 Exosome component 7.

References

Further reading